Kaylen Miller is a Fijian rugby league footballer who plays as a  forward for the Mount Pritchard Mounties in the Ron Massey Cup and Fiji at international level.

Background
He was born in Somosomo, Taveuni, Cakaudrove, Fiji.

Club career
Miller previously played for the Bulls and the St. George Illawarra Dragons.

He plays for the Mount Pritchard Mounties in the Ron Massey Cup.

International career
In June 2022 Miller made his international début for the Fiji Bati side against Papua New Guinea.

In October 2022 Miller was named in the Fiji squad for the 2021 Rugby League World Cup.

References

External links
NRL profile
Rakaviti profile
Fiji profile

Living people
Rugby league second-rows
Fiji national rugby league team players
Mount Pritchard Mounties players
Year of birth missing (living people)